Acromyrmex pubescens is a species of New World ants of the subfamily Myrmicinae of the genus Acromyrmex.  They are native to Paraguay.

Description
Like other members of the genus Acromyrmex and the closely related genus Atta, Acromyrmex pubescens are commonly known as "leafcutter ants".

A. pubescens has four pairs of spines and a rough exoskeleton, features which distinguish it and other members of the genus Acromyrmex from the genus Atta. The pair of front spines are longer than the pair of middle spines, similar to Acromyrmex lundii, but unlike A. lundii, A. pubescens is covered with dense sometimes overlapping fuzz on their bodies.

Taxonomy

Acromyrmex pubescens were first described by the Italian entomologist Carlo Emery in 1905. They were originally classified as a subspecies of Acromyrmex lundii because of their structural similarity. They were named 'pubescens' (Latin for "downy") because of the presence of thick fuzzy hair that covers most of their bodies in contrast to the relatively bare A. lundii. A careful reexamination by the American entomologist Alexander L. Wild in 2007 resulted in their reclassification as a separate species.

Ecology
A. pubescens, like most leafcutter ants, subsist mostly through a mutualistic relationship with fungi of the genus Leucocoprinus. They cultivate the fungi with masticated leaves taken from nearby trees. They are mostly found in isolated 'islands' of trees found in Paraguayan chaco savannahs.

See also
List of leafcutter ants

References

Acromyrmex
Hymenoptera of South America
Insects described in 1905